The Road to Fortune is a 1930 British drama film directed by Arthur Varney and starring Guy Newall, Doria March and Florence Desmond. It was based on a novel by Hugh Broadbridge.

It was shot at Twickenham Studios and on location in Cornwall. It was made as a quota quickie for release by Paramount Pictures.

Cast
 Guy Newall as Guy Seaton
 Doria March as June Eastman
 Florence Desmond as Toots Willoughby
 Stanley Cooke as Prof. Kingsbury
 George Vollaire as Dr. Killick
 J.H. Wakefield as Willard
 Jean Lester as Miss Lurcher

References

Bibliography
 Chibnall, Steve. Quota Quickies: The Birth of the British 'B' Film. British Film Institute, 2007.
 Low, Rachael. Filmmaking in 1930s Britain. George Allen & Unwin, 1985.
 Wood, Linda. British Films, 1927-1939. British Film Institute, 1986.

External links

1930 films
1930 drama films
British drama films
Films directed by Arthur Varney
British black-and-white films
Films shot at Twickenham Film Studios
Films shot in Cornwall
Quota quickies
Paramount Pictures films
1930s English-language films
1930s British films